Višnjan Observatory (obs. code: 120) is an astronomical observatory located near the village of Višnjan in Croatia. It is headed by Korado Korlević, a prolific astronomer and discoverer of minor planets. In 2009, the Višnjan observatory moved to Tičan (at ) and received the obs. code L01 on 5 October 2017.

Description 

Višnjan Observatory was founded in 1992, as a public observatory. It worked in the field of astrometry and search of a new asteroids. Increasing light pollution made the observations in Višnjan difficult, and they stopped in 2001. In 2009, a new building of the observatory was opened near the village of Tičan, approximately 2.5 kilometers away.

According to the statistic on observatory's website (Višnjan and Tičan) as of 2016, a total of 1420 asteroids and 2 comets have been discovered at the observatory, which uses 11 telescopes and has a staff of 78 members and volunteers.

The Minor Planet Center (MPC) directly credits the Višnjan Observatory with the discovery of 108 minor planets (see list below), while 1294 discoveries are credited to Korado Korlević. (The observatory's statistic may also include unnumbered minor planets for which the MPC does not assign a discoverer.)

The observatory is home of several summer programs for youth in astronomy, archeology, marine biology and other disciplines: Youth Science Camp, Summer School of Science and Višnjan School of Astronomy.

List of discovered minor planets

See also 
 List of asteroid-discovering observatories
 List of astronomical observatories
 
 List of observatory codes

References

External links 
 
 http://www.en.sci.hr/

Astronomical observatories in Croatia
Buildings and structures in Istria County

Minor-planet discovering observatories